Alexandre da Silva Mariano (born 28 February 1973), best known as Amaral, is a retired Brazilian footballer who played as a defensive midfielder.

An international for Brazil, he participated in the Summer Olympics, winning a bronze metal. During his club career, he passes through numerous clubs, winning league titles at Palmeiras, Corinthians, Vasco da Gama and Beşiktaş.

Club career
Born in Capivari, during his youth, and before he turned professional, he worked at a funeral parlor. Developed at Palmeiras, for which he made his debut in 1992. He appeared in 244 matches for Palmeiras, and helped them win the 1993 and 1994 Brasileirão, as well two Campeonato Paulista in the same years. He scored his only goal for Palmeiras in a 5–1 win against Grêmio in the quarter-finals of the 1995 Copa Libertadores.

With his performances, Palmeiras sold him to Parma in 1996. The Italians had Buffon, Hernán Crespo, Dino Baggio and Lilian Thuram, with Amaral struggled to perform, only making four appearances, before being loaned to Benfica in December 1996. He made his debut on a home draw against Marítimo on 22 December 1996, and quickly earned his place in the starting XI, in favour of Bruno Caires and Jamir Gomes. He returned to Palmeiras for the remaining Brazilian league, helping the São Paulo-side finish second.

In December 1997, Amaral moved back to Benfica on a permanent deal, as an election promise from João Vale e Azevedo. However, he appeared only sporadically, as Graeme Souness opted for Kandaurov in 1997–98, and then signed Michael Thomas in the following season. In July 1998, he was loaned to Corinthians for one year. There, he was part of the squad that won two consecutive league titles, in 1998 and 1999, as well another State Championship. A year later, he moved to Vasco da Gama on the same predicament. He continued to bag league titles, winning his fifth title in 2000, as well two other titles, the Torneio Rio – São Paulo and the Copa Mercosur.

On 28 June 2000, Amaral signed with Fiorentina for a fee of 7.35 billion lire (€3.796 million). He reunited with Nuno Gomes, who also signed with the Italians, and during his first season, he help the team win the Coppa Italia. After a complicated second season, which ended in bankruptcy. The 29-year-old moved to Beşiktaş but stayed just six months, being released in January due to the lack of opportunities "I did not have many first-team chances, I could not play as much as I wanted to."

After leaving Turkey, Amaral became a constant journeyman, moving from club to club on a yearly basis. In 2008, he moved to Australia, to play for Perth Glory who scored a major recruiting coup after snaring the services of the Brazilian international midfielder for the 2008/09 Hyundai A-League season. He brought a wealth of experience to the Glory and become a fan favourite, but he was ruled out for the rest of the season after aggravating a hamstring injury. Amaral was released by Perth on 2 May 2009.

In August 2009, he rejoined the Glory after signing a nine-match guest contract. The stint was rather uneventful, with Amaral only having featured for the side a few times off the bench, but despite this Amaral enjoyed his return to Perth and thanked the club for giving him another chance. Already at the age of 40 years, he had brief spells with Poços de Caldas and Itumbiara during 2013, making only one official appearance for Itumbiara.

International career
He made his debut for the national team on 27 September 1995, in a 2–1 win against Romania. In January 1996, he participated in the 1996 CONCACAF Gold Cup, won by Mexico against Brazil, and six months later played the Summer Olympics alongside Roberto Carlos, Bebeto, Ronaldo and Rivaldo, finishing with the bronze medal. His last game was on 31 August 1996, in a friendly against Netherlands.

Other works
In 2015, Amaral participated as a contestant in the reality television series A Fazenda 8.

In 2022, he performed cosplayed as a dog in the reality singing competition The Masked Singer Brasil.

Honours

Palmeiras
Serie A: 1993, 1994, 
Campeonato Paulista: 1993, 1994, 1996
Rio-São Paulo Tournament: 1993

Corinthians
Serie A: 1998, 1999
 Campeonato Paulista: 1999Vasco da GamaSerie A: 2000
Rio-São Paulo Tournament: 1999
Guanabara Cup: 2000
Mercosul Cup: 2000FiorentinaCoppa Italia: 2000–01Beşiktaş'''
Süper Lig: 2002–03

References

External links
 
 

1973 births
Living people
People from Capivari
Brazilian footballers
Brazil international footballers
Association football midfielders
Footballers at the 1996 Summer Olympics
Olympic bronze medalists for Brazil
Olympic footballers of Brazil
Campeonato Brasileiro Série A players
A-League Men players
Primeira Liga players
Serie A players
Süper Lig players
Ekstraklasa players
Brazilian expatriate footballers
Brazilian expatriate sportspeople in Turkey
Expatriate footballers in Turkey
Expatriate footballers in Indonesia
Expatriate footballers in Portugal
Expatriate footballers in Italy
Brazilian expatriate sportspeople in Poland
Expatriate footballers in Poland
Expatriate soccer players in Australia
Olympic medalists in football
Sociedade Esportiva Palmeiras players
Parma Calcio 1913 players
S.L. Benfica footballers
Sport Club Corinthians Paulista players
CR Vasco da Gama players
ACF Fiorentina players
Beşiktaş J.K. footballers
Grêmio Foot-Ball Porto Alegrense players
Al-Gharafa SC players
Esporte Clube Vitória players
Clube Atlético Mineiro players
Pogoń Szczecin players
Santa Cruz Futebol Clube players
Grêmio Barueri Futebol players
Perth Glory FC players
Itumbiara Esporte Clube players
Capivariano Futebol Clube players
Medalists at the 1996 Summer Olympics
The Farm (TV series) contestants
Qatar Stars League players
1996 CONCACAF Gold Cup players
Footballers from São Paulo (state)